The 1993 San Francisco 49ers season was the franchise's 44th season in the National Football League (NFL) and their 48th overall. The 49ers appeared in the NFC Championship Game for the second consecutive season and for the fifth time in six seasons. For the first time since 1978, Joe Montana was not on their active roster; specifically, the 49ers had traded him away to the Kansas City Chiefs in April.

Offseason

Personnel

Staff

Roster

Regular season

Schedule

Standings

Playoffs 
The 49ers' NFC West division championship and 10–6 regular-season record earned them the #2 seed in the NFC and a first-round bye in the playoffs. The Detroit Lions, the NFC Central division winners, also had a 10–6 regular-season record, but the 49ers had the tie-breaker edge because they defeated the Lions in the regular season. The Dallas Cowboys, winners of the NFC East with a 12–4 regular-season record, had the #1 seed and a first-round bye of their own.

Schedule

NFC Divisional Game vs. New York Giants 

Ricky Watters was the story of the game as he rushed for an NFL record 5 touchdowns. He had 118 yards rushing on 24 attempts, along with 5 catches for 46 yards. The Giants were never in the game. The 49ers handed the Giants their worst playoff loss in their history, eclipsing their 37–0 loss to the Green Bay Packers in 1961.

NFC Championship Game vs. Dallas Cowboys 

For the second year in a row, the 49ers met the Cowboys in the NFC Championship game. And like the year before, the Cowboys were victorious. The 49ers kept it close in the 2nd quarter, as Steve Young tossed a touchdown pass to Tom Rathman to tie the game at 7. But the Cowboys exploded with 21 consecutive points to go up 28–7 at halftime. The game was put out of reach late in the 3rd quarter when a 42-yard touchdown pass from Bernie Kosar to Alvin Harper put the Cowboys up 35–14. With the loss, the 49ers finished the year at a disappointing 11–7.

Awards and records 
 Led NFL, Points Scored, 473 Points 
 Led NFL, Total Yards, 6,435 Total Yards 
 Jerry Rice, Led NFL, Receiving Yards, 1,503 yards 
 Steve Young, Led NFL, Passer Rating, 101.5 Rating 
 Steve Young, Led NFL, Touchdown Passes, 29 Passes

References

External links 
 1993 49ers on Pro Football Reference
 49ers Schedule on jt-sw.com

San Francisco 49ers
NFC West championship seasons
San Francisco 49ers seasons
1993 in San Francisco
San